Everson Pereira da Silva (born 10 November 1975), known as just Everson, is a retired Brazilian footballer who played as a midfielder.

Developed at Paraná, Everson moved to Europe in 1997, spending time some time with Girondins de Bordeaux, Paris Saint-Germain and Servette. After three years in Germany, he signed with Nice in 2002, where he had the best period of his career, playing over 60 league games in two seasons, scoring eleven times.

In 2004, he moved to Benfica but found it difficult to break into the starting eleven, partially because of injuries. After three years there, intercalated between playing for the reserves, a loan deal with Young Boys, or not competing at all, he left for Neuchâtel Xamax in 2007. He represented three more teams before retiring in 2011.

Career
Born in Campo Grande, Everson began his youth career at Portuguesa de Desportos in 1989, followed by a six-year spell at Paraná. After a few months with América (SP) in early 1997, he moved to Girondins de Bordeaux to play for their reserve team in the CFA, scoring 16 goals in 9 matches. That record attracted the interest of Paris Saint-Germain, who signed him that same year. After some training sessions with Ricardo Gomes, PSG sold him to Servette, where he stayed until the end of 1997. He then joined RWDM Brussels in the start of 1998, and stayed there for 18 months, a period he said it turned him into an adult. In the summer of 1999, Everson moved to German football and spent three years there, two of those in the regional leagues, first at Eintracht Braunschweig, then Arminia Bielefeld and finally VfL Osnabrück. In 2002, he joined the freshly promoted Nice, and became an undisputed starter, playing 60 matches over two seasons, scoring eleven goals, seven from free-kicks. His performances led to a move to Benfica, who signed him on a four-year contract in July 2004. Record wrote that Benfica paid Nice €1.2M to sign him. Everson was described by his former teammate, Lilian Laslandes as a strong, tactically disciplined player that could operate either as defensive or central midfielder; and possessed a powerful left foot.

Although, there was concerns that he was still suffering from a pubalgia brought from Nice, he was declared match-fit on 9 August, and made his debut for Benfica in the Supertaça Cândido de Oliveira against Porto. His first start happened in late October, in a home win against Oriental for the Taça de Portugal, followed by 11 minutes against Vitória de Setúbal, in his Primeira Liga debut. However, after months of light treatment to his pubalgia, it was decided that he needed surgery, so he was operated in mid December. with full recovery in a month. After overcoming the injury, Everson was called up by Giovanni Trapattoni on some occasions, but did not play again. Because of the 11 minutes played with Setúbal, he too won the league title. The following season, Everson was expected to remain with the first-team, but he was deemed surplus by Ronald Koeman, and ultimately demoted to the reserve team.

After half a season competing in the third tier, he was loaned to BSC Young Boys for the remainder of the season. At Young Boys, Everson helped them reach the Swiss Cup Final, which they lost to FC Sion on penalties. He returned to Benfica in the following season and spent the entire season without competing. In July 2007, he moved to Neuchâtel Xamax on a permanent deal, scoring his first goal on 1 September, against Grasshopper. After leaving Neuchâtel Xamax, he played briefly at Étoile du Sahel, returned to Germany to play for TuS Koblenz, and closed his career at age 34, in Gueugnon. In 2011, Everson returned to Nice to work in their media department; he regularly appears as a host and interviewer in videos on the official website.

Honours
Benfica
Primeira Liga: 2004–05
Taça de Portugal: Runner-up 2004–05
Supertaça Cândido de Oliveira: Runner-up 2004

Young Boys
Swiss Cup: Runner-up 2005–06

References

External links

1975 births
Living people
People from Campo Grande
Brazilian footballers
R.W.D.M. Brussels F.C. players
Arminia Bielefeld players
Servette FC players
Eintracht Braunschweig players
VfL Osnabrück players
OGC Nice players
S.L. Benfica footballers
S.L. Benfica B players
BSC Young Boys players
Neuchâtel Xamax FCS players
Étoile Sportive du Sahel players
TuS Koblenz players
Swiss Super League players
Belgian Pro League players
2. Bundesliga players
Ligue 1 players
Primeira Liga players
Brazilian expatriate footballers
Expatriate footballers in Germany
Expatriate footballers in France
Expatriate footballers in Portugal
Expatriate footballers in Switzerland
Expatriate footballers in Belgium
Association football midfielders
Sportspeople from Mato Grosso do Sul